The greater painted-snipe (Rostratula benghalensis) is a species of wader in the family Rostratulidae. It is found in marshes in Africa, South Asia and South-east Asia.

Description

Medium-sized, plump wading bird. Long reddish-brown bill, slightly decurved at tip, and distinct white or pinkish eye patch. Rounded, buff-spotted wings and short tail. White of breast extends up around top of folded wing. The painted-snipe is not related to the true snipes and differs from them in habits, flight and appearance, being far more colorful and having longer legs than the snipes. It is unusual in that the female is larger and more brightly colored than the male, with the sides of the head, neck and throat a rich chestnut brown, and a distinct black band across the breast; the male is paler and greyer.

Behaviour
Not a vocal species; the male at times utters a shrill trill, while the female makes a guttural ook sound as well as hissing noises during breeding displays.

Usually found close to the fringes of reed beds along shorelines of marshes, swamps, ponds and streams.

Solitary or in pairs, sometimes in groups of up to 12. Rather shy and retiring, skulking close to the vegetation so that it can retreat to cover if disturbed. When flushed, flies like a rail with legs dangling. Bobs hindquarters on landing and sometimes when walking. Probes for food in the mud. The female initiates courtship and may mate with more than one male. The male incubates the eggs and takes the parental care.

Food and feeding
They feed on insects, crustaceans, molluscs and seeds.

Reproduction
The females court the males, are polyandrous with males incubating and raising the young as predicted by parental investment theory. Chicks are buff coloured and have black stripes running along their length. Immature birds resemble the male but lack the broken dark band across the breast. Males are also known to carry the chicks to safety under the wings.

The nest is usually a shallow scrape in soft ground, lined with plant material and situated among grass or reeds at the water's edge; sometimes a pad of vegetation or a nest of grass and weeds. The breeding season is between April and July.

Gallery

References

External links
 (Greater) Painted snipe - Species text in The Atlas of Southern African Birds
BirdLife Species Factsheet.

greater painted-snipe
Birds of Africa
Birds of East Asia
Birds of South Asia
Birds of Southeast Asia
Birds described in 1758
Taxa named by Carl Linnaeus